Gaoussou Bamba (born June 17, 1984) is an Ivorian footballer. He currently plays for Yangon United FC.

References

1984 births
Living people
Ivorian footballers
Ivorian expatriate footballers
Bamba Gaoussou
Bamba Gaoussou
Expatriate footballers in Thailand
Expatriate footballers in Myanmar
Ivorian expatriate sportspeople in Thailand
Footballers from Abidjan
Association football forwards
Ivorian expatriate sportspeople in Myanmar